McKowen is a surname. Notable people with the surname include:

Joan McKowen (died 1992), Australian ice hockey player
Scott McKowen, American illustrator

See also
McCowen